"When I See You" is a song by Macy Gray.

When I See You may also refer to:

 "When I See U", a 2006 song by Fantasia
  "Blinded (When I See You)", a 2003 song by Third Eye Blind
 "When I See You", a song by Day of Fire from Losing All
 "When I See You", a song by El DeBarge from Second Chance
 "When I See You", a song by Fats Domino
 "When I See You", a song by Prodigy from H.N.I.C. Pt. 2
 "When I See You", a song by Thompson Twins from A Product Of... (Participation)